C.W. Lemoine is an American author, former military aviator, and YouTuber who was awarded the Navy and Marine Corps Achievement Medal for his service in the reserves. His service spans a period of fifteen years in the United States Air Force and United States Navy reserves, which includes a deployment to Iraq in 2009. He wrote twelve books, nine of which are part of the Spectre series.

Personal life and education
Lemoine initially attended Louisiana State University but later transferred to and graduated from Tulane University in 2005 with a Bachelor of Science in Business Management studying business law and marketing. Lemoine is a brown belt and certified instructor of Survival Krav Maga.

Career

United States Air Force and Navy
Lemoine applied to the Air Force reserve and completed Air Force Officer Training School in 2006, following the completion of his training and graduation from the fighter pilot program, he was stationed in Homestead Air Reserve Base where he flew the F-16 as part of the 93rd Fighter Squadron, with the call sign "Mover". In 2009, Lemoine deployed to Iraq supporting Operation Iraqi Freedom, wherein he averaged sixty to seventy hours within two months on the F-16 and eventually accumulated a thousand hours on the aircraft.

Following the deployment, Lemoine requested for and received a transfer to the Navy Reserves citing his unhappiness from being far away from home and the diagnosis of his father's health condition at the time. He trained on the F-18 and qualified to fly the aircraft in 2012. After flying the aircraft for seven months and following the test of an upper back pain, Lemoine was diagnosed with polycystic kidney disease, suspending him from flying for a period of seven months. As a result of being unable to waiver the medical issue, Lemoine transferred back into the Air Force reserves and in 2018 was commissioned in the reserves as a major, conducting the role of adversary air with F-22 pilots while flying the T-38.     

In 2015, Lemoine was awarded the Navy and Marine Corps Achievement Medal following his actions on the day that his fellow fighter pilot, Abaxes "Chili" Williams' aircraft was struck by lightning. Following the strike, Williams began to feel disoriented with his speech being slurred and had been noticed by Lemoine to be slumping over in the aircraft. Lemoine guided and aided Williams on the approach and with his landing, failing the first attempt but catching the runway trap on the second. Lemoine was cleared to fly a week later, Williams was awarded the Navy Air Medal and was cleared to fly a month later.

Writing and other endeavors
Lemoine began writing as a way to cope with the passing of his mother when he was twelve years old, after the completion of his novella, he attempted to publish it but was unsuccessful when the book wasn't picked up by agents. During his downtime between the transfer from Navy to Air Force reserves, he began writing the Spectre series and self-published the books. The books contain fictional characters with real-life scenarios and events pertaining to Lemoine's life.

Lemoine is a reserve police officer in St. Tammany Parish, Louisiana and has based his book Absolute Vengeance on the events of his experiences in law enforcement, although he has stated that the events are not correlated to his department.

He started his YouTube channel in 2018 during his career as a fighter pilot in the Air Force without a particular purpose, but soon went on to provide career advice on aviation in the military, general gaming videos as well as reaction videos to general as well as military aviation events. He received attention in 2018 for a video in which he analysed the Greek Mirage and Turkish F-16 incidents. In August of that year a Turkish general had stated to "not underestimate the Greeks" following the incident and the reports of Lemoine's comments.

In March 2021, Lemoine aimed to produce an air combat reality show entitled "Fight's On", which would pit one pilot against another in a dogfight. The SIAI-Marchetti S.211 trainer was the selected aircraft, but the project stalled, when fund raising fell short, as a result donations were either returned, or sent to the “Folds of Honor” charity.

Bibliography

Fiction 
 Spectre Rising: A Spectre Thriller (2013) 
 Avoid, Negotiate, Kill: A Spectre Thriller (2014) 
 Archangel Fallen: A Spectre Thriller (2015) 
 Executive Reaction: A Spectre Thriller (2015)
 Brick by Brick: A Spectre Thriller (2016)
 Stand Against Evil: A Spectre Thriller (2016)
 Spectre Origins: A Spectre Thriller (2017) 
 Absolute Vengeance: The Alex Shepherd Story (2017) 
 The Helios Conspiracy: A Spectre Thriller (2018)
 I Am the Sheepdog: An Alex Shepherd Novel (2018)
 Fini Flight: A Spectre Thriller (2019)
 N.O. JUSTICE: An Alex Shepherd Novel (2021)

References 

American YouTubers

1983 births
Living people
American writers
United States Air Force personnel of the Iraq War
United States Navy officers
United States Air Force officers
American people of French descent
Military personnel from Louisiana
Tulane University alumni